Limnochromis is a small genus of cichlid fish endemic to Lake Tanganyika in east Africa.

Species
There are currently three recognized species in this genus:
 Limnochromis abeelei Poll, 1949	  
 Limnochromis auritus Boulenger, 1901 (Spangled cichlid)
 Limnochromis staneri Poll, 1949

References

 
Limnochromini

Taxa named by Charles Tate Regan
Cichlid genera